Chittur is one among the 6 taluks in Palakkad district of Indian state of Kerala. There are 30 revenue villages in chittur taluk. It is situated on the eastern side of Palakkad district.

Constituent villages
 Ayiloor, Chittur, Elavanchery, Eruthempathy, Kairadi 

 Koduvayoor-1, Koduvayoor-2, Kollengode-1, Kollengode-2, Kozhinjampara

 Kozhipathy, Moolathara, Muthalamada-1, Muthalamada-2, Nallepilly 

 Nelliyampathy, Nenmara, Ozhalapathy, Pallassana, Pattanchery

 Perumatty, Puthunagaram, Thathamangalam, Thekkedesom, Thiruvazhiyad

 Vadakarapathy, Vadavannur, Valiyavallampathy, Vallanghy and Vandithavalam

Demographics
As of 2011 Census, Chittur taluk had total population of 437,738 people, of which 215,309 are males and 222,429 are females. The average sex ratio is 1033 females per 1000 males is higher than national average (943 females per 100 males). Population in the age group 0-6 was 40,994 (9.4% of total population). Chittur had overall literacy of 83.19% lower than kerala state average of 94.00%: male literacy was 89.17% and female literacy was 77.44%.

Religions
Chittur taluk constitutes majority of Hindus followed by Muslims, Christians and other minorities.

Languages

References

Taluks of Kerala